Sesión continua is a 1984 Spanish drama film written, produced and directed by José Luis Garci.

José Luis Garci wanted to cast Alfredo Landa and José Sacristán, but both actors refused because of professional rivalry between them. By the time the film was produced, Garci also worked as radio presenter on Antena 3 Radio. Some of the uncredited actors we can see in the film are actually presenters on the same radio station.

Awards
The film was an Academy Award nominee as Best Foreign Film.

Plot
The story is about a friendship between two writers, one a novelist, the other a screenwriter.

See also
 List of submissions to the 57th Academy Awards for Best Foreign Language Film
 List of Spanish submissions for the Academy Award for Best Foreign Language Film

References

External links
 

1984 films
1984 drama films
Spanish drama films
1980s Spanish-language films
Asturias in fiction
Madrid in fiction
Films with screenplays by José Luis Garci
Films directed by José Luis Garci
1980s Spanish films